Vernon Circle is a road in Canberra, Australia that encircles City Hill.

It was named after Walter Liberty Vernon.

References

Streets in Canberra